In Guezzam Airport  is an airport near In Guezzam, Algeria. It is not open for public use.

References

External links 
 Google Maps - In Guezzam
 
 

Airports in Algeria
Buildings and structures in In Guezzam Province